B. nitida may refer to:

 Baphia nitida, the camwood or African sandalwood, a tree species found in Africa
 Bornetella nitida, a marine alga species found in throughout the Pacific Ocean, including Mauritius, Indonesia, Australia and Japan
 Buddleja nitida, a shrub species endemic to much of Central America

See also 
 Nitida (disambiguation)